Vojak is a surname. Notable people with the surname include:

Antonio Vojak (1904–1975), Italian footballer
Oliviero Vojak (1911–1932), Italian footballer, brother of Antonio

See also

 Wojak, an Internet meme